Sainz is a surname. Notable people with the surname include:

Adolfo Fernández Sainz (born 1947), Cuban journalist
Alberto Sainz (born 1937), Argentine association football player
Bernard Sainz (born 1943), French unlicensed sports doctor, convicted for administering doping
Borja Sainz (born 2001), Spanish association football player
Carlos Sainz (born 1962), Spanish rally driver
Carlos Sainz Jr. (born 1994), Spanish racing driver, son of Carlos Sainz
Casimiro Sainz (1853–1898), Spanish painter
Enrique Sáinz (1917–1999), Spanish field hockey player
Faustino Sainz Muñoz (born 1937), Spanish prelate of the Roman Catholic Church
Gustavo Sainz (born 1940), Mexican writer
Inés Sainz (born 1978), Mexican journalist
Inés Sáinz Esteban, Spanish beauty pageant
Joana Sainz García (1989–2019), Spanish singer, dancer, and songwriter who was killed onstage by a faulty pyrotechnic
José Sáinz Nothnagel (1907–1984), Spanish right-wing activist and politician 
Lolo Sainz (born 1940), Spanish former basketball player and coach
Lucía Sainz (born 1984), Spanish tennis and padel player
Luis Sáinz Hinojosa (born 1936), Bolivian prelate of the Catholic Church
Pablo Sáinz Villegas (born 1977), Spanish classical guitarist
Pedro Sainz Rodríguez (1897–1986), Spanish writer, philologist, publisher and politician
Regino Sainz de la Maza (1896–1981), Spanish classical guitarist
Renato Sáinz (1899–1982), Bolivian association football player
Severiano Sainz y Bencamo (1871–1937), the second Bishop of the Roman Catholic Diocese of Matanzas (1915–1937)
Steven Sainz (born 1994), US politician, Republican member of the Georgia House of Representatives
Tina Sainz (born 1945), Spanish actress

See also
Sanz (disambiguation)